Being Human is a supernatural drama television series developed for North American television by Jeremy Carver and Anna Fricke, based upon the British series of the same name created by Toby Whithouse. The show has an ISAN assigned root ID of 137959 (0002-1AE7) except for the first episode of season three being 213433 (0003-41B9). The series premiered on Syfy and SPACE on January 17, 2011 with a thirteen episode first season and tells the story of Aidan (Sam Witwer) and Josh (Sam Huntington), a vampire and a werewolf respectively, who move into a new apartment only to discover that it is haunted by the ghost of a previous tenant, Sally (Meaghan Rath). Together, the three of them discover that being human is not as easy as it seems.

A total of 52 episodes of Being Human were broadcast over four seasons. The series finale aired on April 7, 2014.

Series overview

Episodes

Season 1 (2011)

Season 2 (2012)

Season 3 (2013)

Season 4 (2014)

References

External links 
 
 
 

Lists of comedy-drama television series episodes
Lists of fantasy television series episodes
Lists of American comedy-drama television series episodes
Lists of Canadian television series episodes
 NA